Icarus is a character in Greek mythology.

Icarus or Ikarus may also refer to:

People
 Roger Squires (born 1932), crossword compiler who has used the pseudonym Icarus
 Icarus (wrestler) (born 1982), wrestler with the Chikara organization

Places
 Icarus (island), in the Aegean Sea
 Ikaros (Failaka Island), in the Persian Gulf

Aviation

Aircraft
 Icarus I, Icarus II and Icarus V, series of rigid-wing hang gliders designed by Taras Kiceniuk, Jr.
 Ikarus C42, a microlight aircraft
 Ikarus IK-2, the most notable indigenous Yugoslav aircraft of the 1930s and World War II era
 Icarus, a prototype space rescue vehicle tested by Aleksandr Serebrov

Aviation businesses and organizations
 Ikarus Drachen Tomas Pellicci, a German hang glider manufacturer
 Icaro Air, an Ecuadorian airline
 Icarus School, a military aviation academy
 Icarus, a Greek airline that preceded Olympic Airlines
 Ikarus, a Yugoslav aircraft manufacturer later renamed Ikarbus

Other uses in aviation
 Coupe Icare ("Icarus Cup"), a flight festival

Other businesses and organizations
 Icarus Project, a mental health organization
 Icarus Theatre Collective, a British theatre company
 Ikarus (Hungarian company), a Hungarian bus manufacturer
 Ikarbus, a Serbian bus manufacturer formerly known as Ikarus
 Icarus Football, an association football kit and sportswear brand

Arts and entertainment

Film and television
 Icarus (Planet of the Apes), a spacecraft in the Planet of the Apes franchise
 Icarus Base, a place in the series Stargate Universe
 Icarus, an orbital superweapon in the James Bond film Die Another Day
 Icarus I, and Icarus II, spacecraft in Sunshine
 Icarus (2010 film) (also The Killing Machine), an action film
 Icarus (2017 film), a documentary film by Bryan Fogel
 "Icarus" (Scandal), an episode of the TV series Scandal
 "Icarus", the eleventh episode of Smallville, Season 10
 "Icarus", the seventh episode of Law & Order: Criminal Intent

Fictional characters
 Icarus (comics), a Marvel Comics character
 Icarus, a mecha in Chōjin Sentai Jetman
 Icarus, a Deus Ex character
 Icarus, a character in Hercules: The Animated Series
 Icarus, a character in Little Nemo: Adventures in Slumberland
 Ikaros, a character in Heaven's Lost Property
 Icarus, a primary character based on the Greek myth in the Cirque du Soleil show Varekai

Music
 Icaros, shamanic medicine songs
 Icarus (band), a band from London, England

Albums
 Icarus (The Forms album), 2003
 Icarus (Chicosci album), 2004
 Icarus (Paul Winter Consort album), 1972
 Icarus EP, a 2011 EP by Periphery
 Icaro, an album by Renato Zero
 Icarus (Cryalot EP), 2022

Songs
 "Icarus" (Greeeen song), 2015
 "Icarus" (Madeon song), 2012
 "Icarus" (R3hab song), 2016
 "Icarus", a song by Alesana on the album On Frail Wings of Vanity and Wax
 "Icarus", a song by Flutlicht
 "Icarus", a song by Santigold on the album Top Ranking
 "Icarus", a song by Jason Webley on the album Only Just Beginning
 "Ikarus", a song by Unheilig on Phosphor
 "Icarus", a song by Bastille on the album Bad Blood
 "Icarus", a song by Ralph Towner on the album Diary
 "Icarus - Borne on Wings of Steel", a song by Kansas on the album Masque
 "Icarus", a song by JJ Project on the EP Verse 2, 2017
 "Icarus", a song by Eden on the album vertigo
 "Icarus", a song by Monkey3 on the album The 5th Sun, 2013
 "Ikarus", a song by Diary of Dreams on the album Grau im Licht, 2015
 "Icarus", a song by Emma Blackery from the 2018 album Villains
 "Icarus", a song by Starset on the album Horizons, 2021

Other media
 Icarus (magazine), a Trinity College student publication
 Icarus (sculpture), 1973 by Michael Ayrton

Software and video games
 Icarus (video game), a sci-fi survival video game developed by RocketWerkz
 Ikarus (typography software), a type design and production software developed by URW foundry
 Ikarus (Scheme implementation), a free software optimizing incremental compiler for R6RS Scheme
 Icarus Verilog, an implementation of the Verilog hardware description language
 BioShock Infinite, codenamed "Project Icarus" during development
 Ikarus (chess), a computer chess program

Science and technology

Space
 1566 Icarus, an asteroid
 ICARUS experiment, a neutrino detector at Gran Sasso National Laboratory, Italy
 Icarus (crater), on the Moon
 Icarus (journal), a planetary science journal
 Icarus (star), most distant individual star detected (as of April 2018)
 IKAROS, an interplanetary unmanned solar sail spacecraft
 Project Icarus (interstellar), a design study of an interstellar spacecraft based on Project Daedalus
 Project Icarus (photography) (2009), a project at the Massachusetts Institute of Technology (MIT)

Other uses in science and technology
 Icarus (plant), a fern genus
 ICARUS Initiative, an international project studying the migration routes of flying animals
 IKZF1, a protein in humans that is encoded by the IKZF genes of the Ikaros family zinc finger group

Other uses
 HMS Icarus, the name of several ships
 , a patrol boat of the United States Coast Guard
 Ikarus, a restaurant in Hangar-7 in Salzburg, Austria
 Icarus affair, an incident involving the 1867 murder of two British sailors in Nagasaki
 Operation Ikarus, a World War II German plan to invade Iceland

See also
 Project Icarus (disambiguation)
 Icaros (disambiguation)
 Ikaris, a Marvel Comics character
 Ikaris (Marvel Cinematic Universe), the Marvel Cinematic Universe adaptation